Miss Ripley is a 2011 South Korean television drama series, starring Lee Da-hae, Park Yoo-chun, Kim Seung-woo and Kang Hye-jung. Loosely based on Shin Jeong-ah's case, it aired on MBC from May 30 to July 19, 2011 on Mondays and Tuesdays at 21:55 for 16 episodes.

Plot 
The series follows Jang Mi-ri, whose troubled past causes her to use greed and manipulation in her rise to the top, including manipulating the two men who love her, which leads to her downfall.

Cast 
Lee Da-hae as Jang Mi-ri 
Park Ha-young as young Mi-ri 
Jung Da-bin as teenage Mi-ri 
Park Yoo-chun as Yutaka / Song Yoo-hyun  
Kim Seung-woo as Jang Myung-hoon 
Kang Hye-jung as Moon Hee-joo 
Choi Myung-gil as Lee Hwa 
Kim Jung-tae as Hirayama 
Hwang Ji-hyun as Lee Gwi-yeon 
Lee Sang-yeob as Ha Chul-jin 
Song Jae-ho as President Lee 
Jang Yong as Song In-soo 
Kim Na-woon as Kang Shi-young 
Kim Chang-wan as Director Choi 
Baek Bong-ki as Deputy Manager Kim 
Lee Bo-ram as Jo Eun-bom 
Min Joon-hyun as Manager Han 
Park Ji-yeon as Yuu (cameo, ep 3) 
 as themselves (cameo, ep 3) 
Yang Mi-kyung as Akiko Sakamoto, Yoo-hyun's mother 
Um Ki-joon as prosecutor (cameo) 
Maeng Sang-hoon

Awards and nominations

References

External links 
 
Miss Ripley at MBC Global Media

2011 South Korean television series debuts
2011 South Korean television series endings
MBC TV television dramas
Korean-language television shows
Television series by C-JeS Entertainment
South Korean melodrama television series
South Korean romance television series